Soroveta is a monotypic genus of flowering plants belonging to the family Restionaceae. The only species is Soroveta ambigua.

Its native range is Southwestern South African Republic.

References

Restionaceae
Monotypic Poales genera